Triphenyliodoethylene (TPIE), also known as iodotriphenylethylene or as phenylstilbene iodide, as well as triphenylvinyl iodide, is a synthetic nonsteroidal estrogen of the triphenylethylene group that is related to triphenylchloroethylene and triphenylbromoethylene and was never marketed.

See also
 Broparestrol
 Chlorotrianisene
 Estrobin

References

Abandoned drugs
Organoiodides
Synthetic estrogens
Triphenylethylenes